Rundle Street, often referred to as "Rundle Street East" as distinct from Rundle Mall, is a street in the East End of the city centre of Adelaide, the capital of South Australia. It runs from Pulteney Street to East Terrace, where it becomes Rundle Road through the East Park Lands. (A separate Rundle Street continues from Rundle Road through Kent Town). Its former western extent, which ran to King William Street, was closed in 1972 to form the pedestrian street of Rundle Mall. The street is close to Adelaide Botanic Gardens, Rundle Park / Kadlitpina, Rymill Park, Hindmarsh Square and North Terrace.

The street was named after John Rundle, a director of the South Australia Company and member of the British House of Commons, by the Street Naming Committee on 23 May 1837. It was installed with the first electric street lighting in South Australia in 1895 at the former intersection of Rundle, King William and Hindley streets.

The street contains numerous cafés, restaurants,  shops, cinemas (via Cinema Place), clubs and hotels. It is one of Adelaide's most popular streets for cafés and fashion. Most of the street has a heritage façade, but has been redeveloped for modern use, with some buildings converted to residences, such as the East End Markets.

The street is two-lane with parking on both sides plus bicycle lanes. A tramline ran through the street in the early 20th century.

Rundle Lantern
The south-east corner of Rundle and Pulteney street was for much of the 20th century the site of a six-storey Victorian-style building opened as the Grand Central Hotel in 1911 for the Melbourne retail firm of Foy & Gibson and designed to complement their furniture emporium adjacent.
The Grand Central in its turn replaced the elegant and exclusive two-storey York Hotel, but despite some high-profile guests (the Prince of Wales in 1920, Arthur Conan Doyle in 1922), it never prospered, and around 1925 was absorbed into the emporium. The building was sold to the Electricity Trust for showrooms and offices, then in 1975–1976 was demolished to make way for a multi-level car park, an open, austere structure of concrete slabs and iron railings.

In late 2006, the Adelaide City Council proposed to transform Rundle Street's western approach, the Pulteney Street-Rundle Mall junction, into a Piccadilly Circus or Times Square-type meeting place at a cost of around $1.5 million. The proposal, based on ideas expressed in mid-2005 for neon billboards and video screens, included an initial nine design concepts, which were narrowed to two for consideration by the Council in early 2007. A minimal design called the Rundle Lantern – a 748 panel LED lighting display wrapping around the façade of the Rundle Street carpark – was eventually selected, with the Council deciding video screens were inappropriate for the location.
The Rundle Lantern was designed and developed by the Fusion company, with the design strategy focused on creating a 'lantern' for the city to use as a dynamic cultural canvas. There has been controversy about crediting artists that have contributed to the lantern.

Notable traders
Pubs include the Exeter Hotel, The Austral, The Elephant British Pub, The Stag Public House,  and the Belgian Beer Cafe.

Fashion retailers include Miss Gladys Sym Choon, owned by a company which retained the name of one of the Sym Choon family's businesses, in existence since the 1920s, when they bought the business in 1985.

The Palace Nova Eastend, a cinema complex which hosted the Adelaide Film Festival in 2020, as well as continuing to host series of other annual film festivals created by other organisations, such as the Alliance Française's  French Film Festival, along with regular screenings of other films in their 12 cinemas, including the Eximax, the largest screen in Adelaide.

The Grand Central Hotel was a magnificent heritage building which was located on the corner of Rundle Street and Pulteney Street. It was later concerted into a Foy and Gibson retail store. The building was demolished in 1975 and the Rundle Street UPark was built there.

Junction list

Bent Street and Union Street run through to Grenfell Street on the southern side, Ebenezer Place runs south leading to a pedestrianised precinct and turns westwards into Union Street, while the cul de sac Synagogue Place, and pedestrianised Vaughan Place (next to the Exeter and leading to The Elephant Palace Nova) run off the northern side.

Rundle Street siege
In September 1976, a Victorian man, Michael O'Connor, entered Hambly Clark's gun shop (now closed) at 182 Rundle Street, between Pulteney Street and Synagogue Place, and stole two shotguns which he loaded with his own ammunition. He then began shooting indiscriminately. After a lengthy confrontation he was shot by a police sniper and taken to the nearby Royal Adelaide Hospital but was declared dead on arrival.

See also

References

External links
Created by Fusion Rundle Lantern

Streets in Adelaide
Shopping districts and streets in Australia